The 1990 Notre Dame Fighting Irish football team represented the University of Notre Dame in the 1990 NCAA Division I-A football season. The team was coached by Lou Holtz and played its home games at Notre Dame Stadium in South Bend, Indiana.

Rivalries
 Notre Dame beat Michigan State to claim the Megaphone Trophy.
 Notre Dame beat Purdue to claim the Shillelagh Trophy.
 In the Michigan – Notre Dame rivalry, Notre Dame beat Michigan.
 Notre Dame beat USC to claim the Jeweled Shillelagh.
 Notre Dame lost to 1-3 Stanford to lose the Legends Trophy, and costing them a shot at the national championship.

Schedule

Roster

Game summaries

Michigan

Michigan State

 Source: 

The Immaculate Deflection - Rick Mirer's 24-yard completion to Adrian Jarrell, which bounced off hands of MSU LB Todd Murray up and into Jarrell's arms at MSU 2. Three plays later, Culver scored. "There's definitely somebody looking out for us. There's somebody on our side," said Mirer.
 Notre Dame's 60th victory as No. 1 ranked team & 5-0-1 vs. MSU when ranked #1

Purdue

Stanford

 Source:

Air Force

Miami (FL)

Pittsburgh

Navy

Tennessee

 Source:

Penn State

USC

Colorado (Orange Bowl)

Team players drafted into the NFL
 Despite being drafted by the Los Angeles Raiders, the Toronto Argonauts of the Canadian Football League signed Raghib Ismail to a four-year contract worth 18 million dollars in April 1991. The Ismail signing included four million dollars upfront.

Awards and honors
 Raghib Ismail finished second in voting for the Heisman Trophy.
 Raghib Ismail, Walter Camp Award
 Chris Zorich: Lombardi Award

References

Notre Dame
Notre Dame Fighting Irish football seasons
Notre Dame Fighting Irish football